The Communist Party of Bukhara was a political party in the Bukharan People's Soviet Republic. The party was founded in 1918, by a section of the Jadid movement. It was led by N. Husainovym, A. Aliyev, N. Kurbanovym, A. Turaevym, amongst others.

The party sent a consultative delegate to the 2nd congress of the Communist International in the summer of 1920.

The 4th Party Congress, held 16–18 August 1920, appealed to the workers of Bukhara to prepare for armed revolution. Thereafter the Central Committee of the Communist Party of Turkestan decided to dispatch armed fighters to assist the revolution in Bukhara. The uprising began on August 23 in Sakar-Bazar. During one month, the territories of Bukhara were conquered by the revolutionary forces, with the help of the Red Army contingent led by Mikhail Frunze. On September 14 an All Bukhara Revolutionary Committee (i.e. a provisional government) was established. On October 8, the All Bukhara People's Congress launched the Bukharan People's Soviet Republic, with the Communist Party of Bukhara as a leading force.

On February 1, 1922, the Communist Party of Bukhara became an affiliate structure of the Russian Communist Party (bolsheviks). When the Soviet Central Asian boundaries were redrawn in 1924, the Communist Party of Bukhara was dissolved and its branches divided between the Communist Party of Uzbekistan and the Communist Party of Turkmenistan.

References

Bukhara
1918 establishments in Russia
1924 disestablishments in the Soviet Union
Communist parties in the Soviet Union
Bukhara
Parties of one-party systems
Political parties established in 1918
Political parties disestablished in 1924
History of Bukhara